Aaron Jackson may refer to:

Aaron Jackson (actor) (born 1973), American actor
Aaron Jackson (basketball) (born 1986), American basketball player
Aaron Michael Jackson
Aaron Jackson (American football) in Cincinnati Bengals draft history
Aaron Jackson (activist)